Dimitri Tavadze (February 6, 1911 – March 6, 1990) was a Georgian artist and scenographer.

Biography

Tavadze was born on February 6, 1911, in the village Tkhilagani, Kutais Governorate; at that time, Tkhilagani was part of the Russian empire. In 1926, he graduated from the secondary school of Kutaisi. During his apprenticeship, he took up drawing lessons together with Petre Otskheli at the art studio under the guidance of Vano Tcheishvili. In 1926, Tavadze entered Tbilisi State Academy of Arts majoring in painting. His teachers included Ioseb Sharleman, Gigo Gabashvili, Evgeni Lansere.

Starting in 1927, Tavadze began working at the Shota Rustaveli State Academic Theatre, first as an assistant producer (1927–1930), then as an artist (1930–1948). Subsequently he was appointed to the position of the chief artist (1948–1976). In 1932, Tavadze made his artistic debut at the Rustaveli Theatre in O. Samsonidze's play, "The Hoop", directed by Sandro Akhmeteli and Shota Aghsabadze. In 1933, he made his first artistic appearance outside of Georgia in Shakespeare's "Othello" in the Kirovabad Theatre, Azerbaijan.

In 1933, the painter Lado Gudiashvili dedicated a complimentary letter to Tavadze: "Dimitri Tavadze, a young artists was distinguished for consciousness and discretion; he, from the beginning owned the mystery of painting only feasible for rather experienced painters".

Tavadze illustrated over 150 plays in 20 different theaters. He collaborated renowned directors such as Sandro Akhmeteli, Dimitri Aleksidze, Mikheil Tumanishvili, Robert Sturua, and Irina Molostova. The majority of Tavadze's projects were staged at the Rustaveli Theatre (57 plays). Fletcher's comedy "The Spanish Curate" and Pavel Kohout's play "Such Love" won special recognition and success. Tavadze's last project was "Do not Abandon the Fire, Prometheus" (Kirovabad – 1983). Dimitri Tavadze died on March 6, 1990, in Tbilisi.

Tavadze was awarded the "Honored Art worker" (1950), the "Laureate of the State Prize" (1951), and the "People's Painter of Georgia" (1967). Starting 1933, Tavadze participated in a number of exhibitions. Tavadze's works were displayed numerous times in Tbilisi, as well as in Moscow (1937, 1956, 1957, 1958, 1967, 1971, 1979), in Leningrad (1937), in São Paulo (1967) and in the German Democratic Republic (1968). He had personal exhibitions in Tbilisi (1964, 1975 ["Shakespeareana"], 1982) and in Moscow (1971).

Tavadze's works are preserved in the Bakhrushin Theatre Museum, Moscow, the National Pushkin Museum, Saint Petersburg, the Georgian State Museum of Theatre, Music, Cinema and Choreography, Tbilisi, and the Museum of Rustaveli Theatre. In addition, some works are preserved in theatres and private collections around the world.

Works

Shota Rustaveli State Academic Theatre
 1932 – P. Samsonidze, "The Hoop". Dir.: Sandro Akhmeteli, Shota Aghsabadze
 1933 – G. Shatberashvili, "The Enemy". Dir.: Sandro Akhmeteli, Shota Aghsabadze
 1936 – S. Kldiashvili, "The Autumn Gentry". Dir.: Kukuri Pataridze
 1937 –
 G. Mdivani, "Alkazar". Dir.: Dimitri Aleksidze
 S. Kldiashvili, "The Generation of the Heroes". Dir.: Kukuri Pataridze
 1938 – G. Mdivani, "The Motherland". Dir.: Dimitri Aleksidze
 1939 – S. Mtvaradze, "Upon the Mountain Range". Dir.: Dimitri Aleksidze
 1940 – S. Kldiashvili, "The Widow of an Earl". Dir.: Dimitri Aleksidze
 1941 –
 S. Kldiashvili, "The Last Knight". Dir.: Akaki Vasadze
 F. Wolf, "Professor Mamlock". Dir.: Dimitri Aleksidze
 1946 –
 C. Goldoni, "Servant of Two Masters". Dir.: Dimitri Aleksidze
 G. Berdzenishvili, "Beginning of the End". Dir.: Akaki Vasadze, Sergo Chelidze
 B. Chirskov, "The Winners". Dir.: Sergo Chelidze
 1947 –
 Ar. d'Usseau and J. Gow, "Deep Are the Roots". Dir.: Dimitri Aleksidze
 N. Pogodin, "The Man with a Rifle". Dir.: Akaki Vasadze
 O. Goldsmith, "She Stoops to Conquer". Dir.: Shota Meskhi
 1948 –
 S. Dolidze, G. Berdzenishvili, "The Aerie". Dir.: Akaki Vasadze
 W. Shakespeare, "Othello". Dir.: Akaki Vasadze, Shota Aghsabadze
 V. Mass, M. Chervinsky, "To Friends, to Comrade". Dir.: Shota Meskhi
 1949 –
 I. Mosashvili, "The Sunk Stones". Dir.: Akaki Vasadze
 V. Pataraia, "Ucha Uchardia". Dir.: Akaki Vasadze
 V. Karsanidze, "Evergreen Ridges". Dir.: Mikheil Tumanishvili
 K. Simonov, "Alien shadow". Dir.: Dimitri Aleksidze
 1950 –
 Sh. Dadiani, "Out of Sparks". Dir.: Akaki Vasadze
 V. Vishnevski, "Unforgettable 1919". Dir.: Micheil Tumanishvili
 1951 – G. Mdivani, "People of Goodwill". Dir.: Shota Meskhi
 1952 –
 P. Kakabadze, "The Forge of Happiness". Dir.: Akaki Vasadze
 D. Kldiashvili, "The Adversity of Darispan". Dir.: Akaki Vasadze
 N. Gogol, "The Gamblers". Dir.: Akaki Dvalishvili
 I. Vakeli, "The Steel". Dir.: Shota Meskhi
 I. Chavchavadze, G. Berdzenishvili, "Otar's Widow". Dir.: Akaki Vasadze
 1953 – A. Sumbatashvili-Yuzhin, "The Betrayal". Dir.: Akaki Khorava
 1954 –
 I. Dubois, "Haiti". Dir.: Akaki Vasadze, Mikheil Tumanishvili
 V. Kandelaki, "The Weed". Dir.: Akaki Dvalishvili
 J. Fletcher and Ph. Massinger, "The Spanish Curate". Dir.: Mikheil Tumanishvili
 1955 – L. Kiacheli, "Tariel Golua". Dir.: Mikheil Tumanishvili
 1956 – I. Vakeli, "A Busy Man". Dir.: Mikheil Tumanishvili
 1957 – A. Pushkin, "Boris Godunov". Dir.: Dimitri Aleksidze
 1958 –
 G. Sevastikoglu, "Angela". Dir.: Leila Varsimashvili, Otar Zautashvili
 Al. Apkhaidze, "The Aragvians". Dir.: Archil Chkhartishvili
 1959 –
 P. Kakabadze, "Kvarkvare Tutaberi". Dir.: Dimitri Aleksidze
 P. Kohout, "Such Love". Dir.: Mikheil Tumanishvili
 V. Kandelaki, "Once Dead". Dir.: Archil Chkhartishvili
 1960 –
 A. Arbuzov, "The Irkutsk Story". Dir.: Mikheil Tumanishvili
 K. Senderbiu, "The Revolt of Women". Dir.: Mikheil Tumanishvili
 1961 –
 V. Kandelaki, "The Lights of Kartli". Dir: Dodo Antadze
 G. Khukhashvili, "The Sea Children". Dir.: Mikheil Tumanishvili
 1962 –
 L. Sanikidze, "The Kutaisians". Dir: Dodo Antadze
 C. Goldoni, "The Mistress of the Inn". Dir.: Mikheil Tumanishvili
 O. Ioseliani, "Once a Person is Born". Dir.: Dimitri Aleksidze
 1963 –
 W. Gibson, "The Miracle Worker". Dir.: Sandro Mrevlishvili
 V. Rozov, "Before Dinner". Dir.: Robert Sturua
 1964 – W. Shakespeare, "A Midsummer Night's Dream". Dir.: Mikheil Tumanishvili
 1965 – 
 I. L. Caragiale, "The Lost Letter". Dir.: Merab Jaliashvili
 N. Aziani, "The Last Masquerade". Dir.: Gizo Jordania
 1967 – L. Kiacheli, "Gvadi Bigva". Dir.: Mikheil Tumanishvili
 1969 – O. Ioseliani, "Until the Ox-Cart Turns Over". Dir.: Mikheil Tumanishvili, Carlo Sakandelidze

Not-implemented settings
1930 – P. Samsonidze, "Director"
1931 – I. Kantaria, "Cholipa"
1933 – I. Kantaria, "Berikaoba"
1946 – G. Eristavi, "Separation"
1952 – A. Lipovsky, "Mayakovsky"
1959 – P. Kakabadze, "Kvarkvare Tutaberi" (Not implemented version)

Marjanishvili State Academic Drama Theatre
 1958 –
 R. Tabukashvili, "The Secretary of the Regional Committee". Dir.: Lili Ioseliani
 M. Baratashvili, "Marine". Dir.: Leo Shatberashvili, Giga Lortkipanidze

Tbilisi Griboedov State Academic Russian Drama Theatre
 1957 – S. Shanshiashvili, "The Mountain Law". Dir.: Dodo Antadze
 1961 –
 O. Chidjavadze, "A Lucky Loser". Dir.: Abram Rubin
 Gr. Abashidze, "A Journey into Three Epochs". Dir.: Abram Rubin
 1964 – L. Chubabria, K. Chavchanidze, "The First Step". Dir.: Konstantin Surmava
 1965 –
 K. Buachidze, "Story of Love". Dir.: Abram Rubin
 M. Mrevlishvili, "Destiny of the Poet". Dir.: Abram Rubin
 K. Buachidze, "Remember our Youth". Dir.: Archil Gomiashvili
 1966 – G. Mdivani, "Your Uncle Misha". Dir.: Sergo Chelidze
 1969 – V. Ejov, "Night of the Nightingale". Dir.: Sergo Chelidze

Tbilisi Vaso Abashidze Music and Drama State Theatre
 1949 – V. Cagareishvili, "Arsen Odzelashvili". Dir.: Boris Gamrekeli
 1950 –
 Fr. Lehár, "The Merry Widow". Dir.: Dude Dzneladze
 G. Cabadze, "The Love Song". Dir.: Boris Gamrekeli
 R. Lagidze, "Friends". Dir.: Dude Dzneladze
 N. Gudiashvili, "Meeting at the Cottage". Dir.: Boris Gamrekeli
 1951 –
 G. Cabadze, "A bright Future". Dir.: Boris Gamrekeli
 V. Cagareishvili, "The Queen of Tsani". Dir.: Dude Dzneladze
 Sh. Milorava, "Once in Spring". Dir.: Ioseb Kutateladze
 N. Gudiashvili, "Gift". Dir.: Boris Gamrekeli
 1956 –
 I. Jarkovsky, "Love Knot". Dir.: Shota Meskhi
 A. Kereselidze, "Three Brides". Dir.: Boris Gamrekeli
 1957 –
 Sh. Milorava, "Dali". Dir.: Boris Gamrekeli
 Sh. Azmaiparashvili, "The desirable Groom". Dir.: Shota Meskhi
 R. Lagidze, "Komble". Dir.: Boris Gamrekeli
 1958 – G. Kakhiani, "Bastard". Dir.: Shota Meskhi
 1960 –
 A. Kereselidze, "Arriving from the Moon". Dir.: Shota Meskhi
 Sh. Milorava, "Strange Guests". Dir.: Boris Gamrekeli
 1966 – Sh. Azmaiparashvili, "It will never be the same again". Dir.: Leri Paksashvili
 1967 – A. Shaverzashvili, "Nino". Dir.: Shota Meskhi
 1968 – Sh. Milorava "The Fatal Operation". Dir.: Shota Meskhi
 1951 – Z. Paliashvili, "Abesalom and Eteri". Dir.: Shota Aghsabadze
 1952 –
 S. Rachmaninoff, "Aleko". Dir.: Shota Aghsabadze
 N. Rimsky-Korsakov, "The Noblewoman Vera Sheloga". Dir.: Shota Aghsabadze
 1953 –
 P. Tchaikovsky, "Eugene Onegin". Dir.: Archil Chkhartishvili
 Ch. Gounod, "Romeo and Juliet". Dir.: Shota Aghsabadze
 1954 – G. Rossini, "The Barber of Seville". Dir.: Shota Aghsabadze
 1957 – G. Verdi, "La traviata". Dir.: Shota Aghsabadze
 1959 – R. Gabichvadze, "Nana". Dir.: Shota Aghsabadze

Tbilisi Nodar Dumbadze Professional State Youth Theatre
 1937 –
 G. Berdzenishvili, "In the Mountains of Adjara". Dir.: Boris Gamrekeli
 E. Schwarz, "Red Riding Hood". Dir.: Aleksandr Takaishvili
 1938 –
 G. Nakhucrishvili, "The Line of Fire". Dir.: Aleksandr Takaishvili
 B. Gamrekeli, "Hero". Dir.: Boris Gamrekeli
 Molière, "Scapin's Deceits". Dir.: Aleksandr Takaishvili
 V. Balaban, "Green Valley". Dir.: Giorgi Darispanashvili
 1939 – A. Tsereteli, "Patara Kakhi". Dir.: Aleksandr Takaishvili
 1940 – K. Gogodze, "Kadjana". Dir.: Giorgi Darispanashvili
 1941 –
 G. Nakhucrishvili, "Achakune". Dir.: Aleksandr Takaishvili
 Sh. Kutshava, "Blue Carpet". Dir.: Giorgi Jordania
 1950 – G. Gogichaishvili, "Bright Path". Dir.: Otar Aleksishvili
 1952 – G. Berdzenishvili, "Old Wound". Dir.: Otar Aleksishvili
 1953 – S. Mtvaradze, "Surami Fortress". Dir.: Aleksandr Takaishvili
 1954 – E. L. Voinitsh, "The Gadfly". Dir.: Iuri Kakulia
 1956 – G. Nakhucrishvili, "Little Warriors". Dir.: Revaz Tsharkhalashvili
 1963 – V. Kataev, "A White Sail Gleams". Dir.: Shalva Gatserelia
 1964 – W. Shakespeare, "Twelfth Night". Dir.: Sergo Chelidze
 1965 – A. Chkhaidze, "When Childhood Ends". Dir.: Shalva Gatserelia

Tbilisi Youth Russian Theatre
 1970 – A. Kuznetsov, "The Moscow Holidays". Dir. Abram Rubin

Tbilisi Petros Adamian State Armenian Drama Theatre
 1956 – M. Mrevlishvili, "Avalanche". Dir.: Ferdinand Bjikyan

Kutaisi Lado Meskhishvili State Drama Theatre
 1956 – M. Japaridze, "Fellow Countryman". Dir.: Akaki Vasadze
 1958 –
 A. Sumbatashvili-Yuzhin, "The Betrayal". Dir.: Akaki Vasadze
 Dumanoir and A. d'Ennery, "Don César de Bazan". Dir.: Tamaz Meskhi
 1959 – K. Lortkipanidze, "The Dawn of Colchis". Dir.: Akaki Vasadze
 1960 –
 V. Daraseli, "Kikvidze". Dir.: Akaki Vasadze
 D. Kldiashvili, "Irina’s Happiness". Dir.: Akaki Vasadze
 L. Sanikidze, "The Kutaisians". Dir.: Akaki Vasadze
 P. Kakabadze, "The Farmer's Wedding". Dir.: Akaki Vasadze, Tamaz Meskhi
 1962 –
 G. Mdivani, "Millions of Guga and Gigo". Dir.: Tamaz Meskhi
 P. Kakabadze, "The Wheel of Life". Dir.: Akaki Vasadze
 G. Taktakishvili, "A White Bat". Dir.: Tamaz Meskhi
 1963 – M. Japaridze, "Bughara". Dir.: Otar Aleksishvili
 1965 – Sh. Dadiani, "Yesterday's People". Dir.: Akaki Vasadze

Batumi Ilia Chavchavadze State Drama Theatre
 1937 – G. Mdivani, "The Blind". Dir.: Dimitri Aleksidze
 1938 –
 S. Mtvaradze, "Tevrath". Dir.: Archil Chkhartishvili
 S. Shanshiashvili, "Arsena". Dir.: Archil Chkhartishvili
 P. Kakabadze, "The Farmer's Wedding". Dir.: Archil Chkhartishvili
 1953 –
 G. Mdivani, "Bagration". Dir.: Shota Meskhi
 M. Mrevlishvili, "Baratashvili". Dir.: Shota Meskhi
 1954 – H. Fast, "Freedom Road". Dir.: Shota Meskhi

Gori Giorgi Eristavi State Drama Theatre
 1963 – L. Milorava, "Curved Staircase". Dir.: Giorgi Abramishvili
 1970 – G. Nakhucrishvili, "Ali Baba". Dir.: Otar Aleksishvili

Chiatura Akaki Tsereteli State Drama Theatre
 1966 – G. Nakhicrishvili, "Shaithan Khikho". Dir.: Otar Aleksishvili
 1970 – A. Getsadze, "Saba Sulkhan". Dir.: Vladimer Modebadze
 1974 – G. Nakhucrishvili, "Komble". Dir.: Solomon Kipshidze
 1975 – L. Kiacheli, "Tariel Golua". Dir.: Solomon Kipshidze
 1976 –
 Lope de Vega, "The Gardener's Dog". Dir.: Solomon Kipshidze
 Molière, "The Doctor in Spite of Himself". Dir.: Solomon Kipshidze

Meskheti State Drama Theatre 
 1971 – P. Kakabadze, "The Farmer's Wedding". Dir.: Alexandr Mikeladze

Tskhinvali Kosta Khetagurov State Drama Theatre
 1968 – Sophocles,"Oedipus Rex". Dir.: Archil Chkhartishvili

Moscow Pushkin Drama Theatre
 1955 – G. Kelbakiani, "The Young Teacher". Dir.: Dimitri Aleksidze

Kiev Lesya Ukrainka National Academic Theatre of Russian Drama
 1954 – M. Baratashvili, "Dragonfly". Dir.: Irina Molostova

Azerbaijan State Academic Drama Theatre
 1972 – N. Dumbadze, "Do not worry, Mom". Dir.: Agakishi Kazimov
 1977 – N. Hikmet, "The Legend of Love". Dir.: Alesker Sharifov

Kirovabad Jafar Jabbarly Theatre
 1933 – W. Shakespeare, "Otello". Dir.: Shota Agsabadze
 1968 – N. Mamedov, "Tariel". Dir.: Yusuf Bagirov
 1972 – W. Shakespeare, "Otello". Dir.: Yusuf Bagirov
 1973 – A. Mamedov, "When the Stars are Meeting". Dir.: Yusuf Bagirov
 1976 – Sophocles, "Antigone". Dir.: Yusuf Bagirov
 1980 – W. Shakespeare, "Richard III". Dir.: Yusuf Bagirov
 1983 – M. Karim, "Do not Break the fire, Prometheus!". Dir.: Yusuf Bagirov

Avar Music and Drama Theatre
1960 –
 K. Zakaryaev, M. Daudov, "Along the Mountain Roads". Dir.: Archil Chkhartishvili
 R. Gamzatov, "The Mountain Girl". Dir.: Archil Chkhartishvili

Georgian State Television 1-st Channel
 1978 – D. Kldiashvili, "Adversity of Darispan". Dir.: Micheil Tumanishvili

Projects
 1963 – W. Shakespeare, "Macbeth"
 1965 – W. Shakespeare, "Otello"
 1970 – W. Shakespeare, "King Lear"
 1974 –
 W. Shakespeare, "Hamlet"
 W. Shakespeare, "Julius Caesar"
 W. Shakespeare, "Romeo and Juliet"
 1985 – H. Ibsen, "Peer Gynt"

Gallery

References

 Georgian Soviet Encyclopedia, volume 4, p. 562;
 Natela Aladashvili. Monograph: "Dimitri Tavadze". Georgian theatrical Society; 1986;
 Елена Луцкая – „Гордость грузинского народа“; „Литературная Грузия“ – 1967 № 7;

External links

Artists from Georgia (country)
Soviet artists
Scenic designers from Georgia (country)
1911 births
1990 deaths
Tbilisi State Academy of Arts alumni
People from Kutais Governorate